Smilax hugeri, common name Huger's carrionflower,  is a North American plant species native to the southeastern United States. It is found in Mississippi, Alabama, Georgia, Florida, Tennessee, and North and South Carolina.

Smilax hugeri is erect herb up to 5 m (15 feet) tall, without spines. Flowers are small and green; berries round and covered with wax.

References

External links
Alabama Plant Atlas
Discover Life

Flora of the Southeastern United States
Plants described in 1903
Smilacaceae
Flora without expected TNC conservation status